Visa requirements for Artsakh citizens are administrative entry restrictions by the authorities of other states placed on citizens of the Republic of Artsakh.

Visa requirements map

Validity
As Artsakh is not recognized by the majority of countries of the world (with the exceptions of Abkhazia, South Ossetia and Transnistria, all of which are also mostly unrecognized), an Artsakh passport is not valid for travel to most countries in the world. However, as dual nationality is permitted, most citizens of Artsakh are entitled to an Armenian passport.

All members of the Community for Democracy and Rights of Nations have agreed to abolish visa requirements for each other's citizens. Artsakh passports can be used to travel to South Ossetia and Transnistria. Artsakh signed a visa-waiver agreement with Abkhazia on 22 February 2016 and the agreement went into effect on 1 April 2016. Citizens of Artsakh may also travel visa-free to neighboring Armenia.

See also

 Artsakh passport
 Foreign relations of Artsakh
 List of nationalities forbidden at border
 Political status of Artsakh
 Visa policy of Armenia
 Visa policy of Artsakh
 Visa requirements for Armenian citizens

References and Notes
References

Notes

Artsakh 
Foreign relations of the Republic of Artsakh